This list includes all the main Antarctic exploration ships that were employed in the seventeen expeditions that took place in the era between 1897 and 1922, known as the Heroic Age of Antarctic Exploration. A subsidiary list gives details of support and relief vessels that played significant roles in the expeditions they were commissioned to support.

The tables do not include the regular whaling voyages that took place during this period, or expeditions such as that of Carl Chun in 1898–1899 in the German vessel Valdiva, which did not penetrate the Antarctic circle. The abortive Cope Expedition of 1920–1922, which collapsed through lack of funding without finding an expedition ship, is likewise excluded, though two men were landed from a Norwegian whaler and spent a year on the Antarctic peninsula.

Of the ships listed, three survived into the 21st century and are serving as museums: Discovery in Dundee, Fram in Oslo, and Uruguay in Buenos Aires.  Two ships – Antarctic and Endurance – were lost in the course of their expeditions; two more – Gauss and Yelcho – were scrapped when their useful lives were over. The fate of the Japanese Kainan Maru is unknown.  The others, twelve ships in all, continued their maritime duties and were wrecked or sunk in the years between 1907 and 1962.

Table 1: Expedition ships
{| class="wikitable sortable"
|-
! scope="col" |Ship/country
! scope="col" |GRT 
! scope="col" |Image
! scope="col" |Expedition
! scope="col" |Leader
! scope="col" class="unsortable"|Subsequent history and fate
|- | scope="row"
| Belgica(formerly Patria)  
| align="center"|263
| align="center"| 
| Belgian Antarctic Expedition 1897–1899
| Adrien de Gerlache
| After her Antarctic voyage, Belgica was employed by a succession of owners in various capacities. Following several years as a research vessel in the Kara and Greenland Seas in 1916 she was renamed Isjford and became a coal freighter.  Subsequently, she was converted into a floating fish factory. After the outbreak of the Second World War she was seized by the British and used as an ammunition depot, before being sunk by the Germans during an air raid on 19 May 1940. The wreck was rediscovered in 1990.
|- | scope="row"
|Southern Cross(formerly Pollux) 
| align="center"|521
|align= "center"|
| British Antarctic Expedition (Southern Cross Expedition) 1898–1900
|Carsten Borchgrevink
| In 1901 Southern Cross was sold, and became a seal hunter. She worked in this capacity until late March or early April 1914. Then, while returning to Newfoundland from the Gulf of St Lawrence, she was lost with her entire complement of 173, in the 1914 Newfoundland Sealing Disaster.  The precise details of the loss of Southern Cross are unclear; one theory is that its overloaded cargo of seal pelts shifted during a storm and caused the ship to capsize. The loss of life was the heaviest in Newfoundland and Labrador sealing history.
|- | scope="row"
|Discovery 
| align="center"|736 
|align="center"|
|National Antarctic Expedition (Discovery Expedition) 1901–1904
|Robert Falcon Scott
|In 1905 Discovery was bought by the Hudson's Bay Company, and used as a cargo vessel until 1911. After some years' inactivity in London, Discovery was used as a supply ship during the First World War. In 1916 she was briefly involved in the search for Shackleton in the aftermath of the Imperial Trans-Antarctic Expedition.  After the war she was acquired by Crown Agents and converted for oceanographic research. In 1929 she returned to the Antarctic with Douglas Mawson and the British Australian and New Zealand Antarctic Research Expedition, before being laid up in London where, moored on the Thames Embankment, she served as a training centre for Scouts and Sea Scouts. In 1953 she was bought by the RNVR and used as a drill ship until 1979, when she was sold to the Maritime Trust and became a museum ship. After a spell in London's St Katherine Docks, in 1986 she was taken to Dundee, her home port, where, having been sold to Dundee Industrial Heritage, she became part of a permanent exhibition there. 
|- | scope="row"
|Gauss  Germany
| align="center"|728
|align= "center"|
| First German Antarctic Expedition(Gauss Expedition) 1901–1903 
|Erich von Drygalski
|After its acquisition by the Canadian government in 1905, Gauss was renamed CGS Arctic and enjoyed a long career as a survey vessel in the Canadian Arctic regions, under the command of Joseph-Elzéar Bernier. Following a break in activities during the First World War, in which Arctic saw service as a floating lighthouse,  Bernier returned in 1922 to command the ship in further Arctic journeys, until his retirement in 1925. Arctic, by then in poor condition, was sold to the Hudson's Bay Company, which dismantled the ship, the hull of which was abandoned on a sandbank.
|- | scope="row"
|Antarctic(formerly Kap Nor) 
| align="center"|346
| align= "center"| 
| Swedish Antarctic Expedition 1901–1903
| Otto Nordenskiöld
| Antarctic did not survive the expedition. After being trapped in pack ice off the Antarctic Peninsula in early 1903, she suffered severe damage and sank off Paulet Island on 12 February 1903. Her complement was rescued without loss of life.
|- | scope="row"
| Scotia(formerly Hekla) 
| align="center"|375
| align= "center"|
|Scottish National Antarctic Expedition 1902–1904
| William Speirs Bruce
| Scotia was sold, and resumed her role as a sealer off the Greenland coast. In 1913 she served as an ice patrol vessel in the North Atlantic. During the First World War she was chartered to the French government and saw service as a freighter. On 18 January 1916 she caught fire, and was burned out on Sully Island in the Bristol Channel.
|- | scope="row"
| Français  
| align="center"|250
|
| Third French Antarctic Expedition 1903–1905
| Jean-Baptiste Charcot
|After the expedition, Français was sold to the Argentine government and renamed Austral. In December 1907 the ship was wrecked on a sandbank  in the Río de la Plata (River Plate).
|- | scope="row"
| Nimrod 
| align="center"|458
| align= "center"|
| British Antarctic Expedition 1907 (Nimrod Expedition) 1907–1909
| Ernest Shackleton
| On his return to England in 1909, Shackleton used Nimrod as a floating museum of the expedition, before selling her to help meet the expedition's debts. She worked as a coal carrier for the next few years. On 31 January 1919, Nimrod was wrecked and destroyed on the Barber Sands in the North Sea off the Norfolk coast. Ten of her twelve crew were lost with her.
|- | scope="row"
| Pourquoi-Pas? IV 
| align="center"|445
| align= "center"| 
| Fourth French Expedition 1908–1910
| Jean-Baptiste Charcot
| Pourquoi-pas? was used by the French Navy as a training ship during the First World War, after which Charcot resumed command, and during the following  years led many scientific and exploratory missions. In 1928 the ship participated in the search for Roald Amundsen, who disappeared in the Arctic while himself involved in a search for the missing Italian explorer Umberto Nobile. On 16 September 1936, en route to St Malo from Reykjavík, Pourquoi-pas? was wrecked when caught in a cyclone off the coast of Iceland. Only one crew member survived; Charcot was among the victims.
|- | scope="row"
| Kainan Maru(formerly Hoko Maru) 
| align="center"|204 
| align= "center"|
| Japanese Antarctic Expedition 1910–1912
| Nobu Shirase
| After the return of the expedition, Kainan Maru was sold back to its former owners, and resumed its work as a fishing vessel.  Shirase devoted many years to raising funds to cover the expedition's debts and the costs of publishing its results. He died in poverty in 1946. The ship may have been sunk in the Gulf of Tonkin in 1944 by a USAAF attack, but this is not conclusively known.
|- | scope="row"
| Fram 
| align="center"|402
| align= "center"|
| Amundsen's South Pole expedition 1910–1912
| Roald Amundsen
| Amundsen had planned to use Fram as the basis of his intended Arctic drift, but delays, followed by the outbreak of war in 1914, negated his plans. Fram was left for many years to deteriorate at her berth in Horten. In 1925 a committee for the ship's preservation was formed, under Otto Sverdrup; in 1929 restoration work began in the shipyard at Sandefjord. Finally, in 1935, the restored Fram was brought to Oslo under the charge of Oscar Wisting, and placed in specially-erected housing. King Haakon formally opened the Fram House on 20 May 1936, where  Fram remains.
|- | scope="row"
| Terra Nova  
| align="center"|744
| align= "center"| 
| British Antarctic Expedition 1910(Terra Nova Expedition) 1910–1913
| Robert Falcon Scott
| After its return from the Antarctic in 1913, Terra Nova was repurchased by its former owners and operated as a sealer between 1913 and 1942. During the Second World War she was employed as a supply ship between Newfoundland and Greenland. On 12 September 1943 the ship suffered damage and began to leak badly. Her crew and certain artifacts were transferred to another vessel, after which the hulk was set alight and sunk by gunfire the next day. In August 2012 the wreck of Terra Nova was discovered by a team from the Schmidt Ocean Institute.
|- | scope="row"
| Deutschland (formerly Bjørn) Germany
| align="center"|598
| align= "center"|
| Second German Antarctic Expedition 1911–1914
| Wilhelm Filchner
|After Deutschland returned to Germany she was sold to Felix König, who was intending to organise and lead an Austrian Antarctic Expedition. The ship's name was  changed to Osterreich. This expedition was cancelled following the outbreak of the First World War. The ship was  requistioned by the Austro-Hungarian Navy, and served as a minesweeper until torpedoed in the Adriatic Sea in 1917.
|- | scope="row"
| Aurora  
| align="center"|386
| align= "center"|
| Australasian Antarctic Expedition 1911–1914
| Douglas Mawson
| At the end of the expedition Aurora was left in Tasmania, and was sold to Sir Ernest Shackleton for £3,200, for use in the Ross Sea party component of the Imperial Trans-Antarctic Expedition.
|- | scope="row"
| Endurance (formerly Polaris) 
| align="center"|350
| align= "center"|
| Imperial Trans-Antarctic Expedition 1914–1917
| Ernest Shackleton
| Endurance was trapped by ice in the Weddell Sea, crushed and abandoned on 27 October 1915, and later sank. Her crew made their way over the ice and by small boats to Elephant Island, from where they were eventually rescued. The wreck was discovered on 5 March 2022.
|- | scope="row"
| Aurora| align="center"|
| align= "center"|
|Ross Sea party 1914–1917 (in support of Imperial Trans-Antarctic Expedition)
| Aeneas Mackintosh
| After completing the rescue mission of the Ross Sea party, Aurora was sold by Shackleton to W.R. Grace & Co of New York, for £10,000. In her new role, on 17 June 1917 she departed for Iquique in Chile, with a cargo of coal. She was never heard of again, although on 5 December 1917 a lifebelt bearing Aurora's name was recovered off the New South Wales coast. The ship was posted as missing by Lloyd's of London on 2 January 1918. Several theories to explain the disappearance have been raised, including severe weather and possible enemy action, but the cause of the loss remains a matter of conjecture.
|- | scope="row"
| Quest(formerly Foca I)
| align="center"|205
|align= "center"|
| Shackleton–Rowett Expedition
| Ernest Shackleton
| After the expedition Quest was sold, and operated by Norwegian owners as a sealer and Arctic research ship until 1940. In 1928 she participated in the search for Umberto Nobile, missing in the Arctic with the airship Italia, and in 1930 was chartered by the British Arctic Air Route Expedition, investigating the possibility of air routes to Canada via Greenland. During the Second World War Quest was loaned to the allied navies; in 1946 she was returned to her owners, and continued to work as a sealer until 5 May 1962, when she was trapped by ice and sank off the coast of Labrador.
|}

Table 2: Support and relief ships

See also
 Heroic Age of Antarctic Exploration

Notes and references
Citations

Sources
Books, journals and newspapers

 

 

 

OnlineBelgicaSouthern CrossGaussAntarcticScotiaPourquoi-pas?Kainan MaruFramTerra NovaAuroraQuestMorningUruguayKoonyaYelcho''

Other ships

Ships 1897
Exploration ships 1897
Ships 1897
History-related lists
Ships 1897
Exploration ships 1897
Exploration ships 1900
Exploration ships 1897